Ken Lacy is a former professional NFL football player who played running back for four seasons for the Kansas City Chiefs. Lacy also played for the 1983 USFL Champion Michigan Panthers.

References

1960 births
American football running backs
Michigan Panthers players
Kansas City Chiefs players
Tulsa Golden Hurricane football players
Living people
National Football League replacement players